The Canadian Agricultural Hall of Fame (French: Temple canadien de la renommée agricole) honours and celebrate Canadians who have made outstanding contributions to the agriculture and food industry and publicizes the importance of their achievements throughout Canada.

Inaugurated in 1960 and located in Toronto, Ontario, the temple is currently administered by an association comprising a board of 12 directors; 3 each from Eastern Canada, Western Canada, Ontario and the rest of the country.

Gallery

Since 1960, the Royal Agricultural Winter Fair in Toronto has been home to the gallery where the association displays portraits of its inductees along with their biographical notes. The gallery is open to the public during the fair in November but can only be visited by appointment during the rest of the year. In 1995-1996, the gallery moved to a more permanent home at the National Trade Center.

Induction Ceremony

The association chooses at the most three inductees each year for all the nominations is receives. During the November Agricultural Fair in Toronto, an induction dinner and portrait unveiling ceremony is held where the life and accomplishments of the year's inductees are celebrated.

Notable Inductees

See also 
 Agricultural Hall of Fame of Quebec
 List of agriculture awards

References 

Halls of fame in Canada
Awards established in 1960
1960 establishments in Canada
Agriculture awards